Jean-François Bizot (14 August 1944 – 8 September 2007) was a French journalist and writer.

Born in Lyon, Bizot was the founder and owner of the Paris-based radio station, Radio Nova, which first broadcast in 1981. He was also the creator of the Actuel publication.

Bizot died of cancer in Paris, aged 63.

External links
AFP Jean-François Bizot biography 
Le Monde: Jean-François Bizot obituary 

1944 births
2007 deaths
French publishers (people)
French radio company founders
Writers from Paris
Deaths from cancer in France
French male non-fiction writers
20th-century French journalists
20th-century French male writers